Takashi Takagi (born 4 June 1962) is a Japanese luger. He competed at the 1980 Winter Olympics and the 1984 Winter Olympics.

References

1962 births
Living people
Japanese male lugers
Olympic lugers of Japan
Lugers at the 1980 Winter Olympics
Lugers at the 1984 Winter Olympics
Sportspeople from Sapporo